Aon (Ancient Greek: Ἄων) in ancient Greek religion, was a son of Poseidon.  He was worshiped particularly in Boeotia, which was also known as Aonia, named after him.

Notes

Children of Poseidon
Demigods in classical mythology
Boeotian characters in Greek mythology